is a former Korean province, one of the administrative divisions of Korea under Japanese rule, with its capital at Seishū (contemporary Cheongju, South Korea). The prefecture consisted of what is now the South Korean province of North Chungcheong.

Population

Number of people by nationality according to the 1936 census:

 Overall population: 907,055 people
 Japanese: 8,598 people
 Koreans: 897,736 people
 Other: 721 people

Administrative divisions

The following list is based on the administrative divisions of 1945:

Counties 

 Seishū (淸州) - (capital): Cheongju (청주).
 Hōon (報恩): Boeun (보은).
 Yokusen (沃川): Okcheon (옥천).
 Eidō (永同): Yeongdong (영동).
 Chinsen (鎭川): Jincheon (진천).
 Kaizan (槐山): Goesan (괴산).
 Injō (陰城): Eumseong (음성).
 Chūshū (忠州): Chungju (충주).
 Teisen (堤川): Jecheon (제천).
 Tan'yō (丹陽): Danyang (단양).

Provincial governors

The following people were provincial ministers before August 1919. This was then changed to the title of governor.

See also
North Chungcheong Province
Provinces of Korea
Governor-General of Chōsen
Administrative divisions of Korea

References

Korea under Japanese rule
Former prefectures of Japan in Korea